

Destinations
As of June 2022, Loganair serves the following destinations:

References

Lists of airline destinations